Joseph Mittathany (12 July 1931 – 11 July 2022) was an Indian Roman Catholic prelate.

Mittathany was born in Kalikave and was ordained to the priesthood in 1959. He served as the bishop of the Roman Catholic Diocese of Tezpur, India, from 1969 to 1980 and then served as bishop and then archbishop of the Roman Catholic Archdiocese of Imphal, India, from 1980 until his retirement in 2006.

References

 

1931 births
2022 deaths
Indian Roman Catholic archbishops
Bishops appointed by Pope Paul VI
Bishops appointed by Pope John Paul II
People from Kottayam district